Cosmic Cleavage is a studio album by American rapper Busdriver. It was released on Big Dada in 2004.  The cover depicts an action figure of the Mazinger Z robot Aphrodite A firing its breast missiles.

Critical reception

Chris Dahlen of Pitchfork gave the album an 8.0 out of 10, saying: "With no breaks or gasps for air between the tracks, Cosmic Cleavage is Busdriver's tightest, most consistent album." However, he added, "it might not be the best starting place for new listeners." Paul Clarke of BBC gave the album 3.5 stars out of 5, describing it as "'acid jazz' in a literally hallucinogenic sense".

Track listing

Personnel
Credits adapted from liner notes.

 Busdriver – vocals
 Daddy Kev – production
 James Morris – bass guitar
 D-Styles – turntables
 Awol One – vocals (3)
 Abstract Rude – vocals (6)

References

Further reading

External links
 

2004 albums
Busdriver albums
Big Dada albums
Albums produced by Daddy Kev